Sexton Blake and the Mademoiselle is a 1935 British crime film directed by Alex Bryce and starring George Curzon as Sexton Blake.

Premise 

Blake must discover who has stolen from a wealthy financier – and discovers a mysterious woman behind the crime.

Cast 
George Curzon as Sexton Blake
Lorraine Grey as Mademoiselle Roxanne
Tony Sympson as Tinker
 Edgar Norfolk as Inspector Thomas  
 Raymond Lovell as Captain  
 Ian Fleming as Henry Norman  
 Vincent Holman as Carruthers  
 Wilson Coleman as Pierre

Critical reception
TV Guide called it "A likable film with the enjoyable Curzon again tackling his Sexton Blake role."

References

External links 

1935 films
British crime films
1935 crime films
1930s English-language films
British black-and-white films
British detective films
Films set in England
20th Century Fox films
Quota quickies
Metro-Goldwyn-Mayer films
Fox Film films
Films directed by Alex Bryce
Films based on British novels
Films based on crime novels
Sexton Blake films
1930s American films
1930s British films